PLO's Ten Point Program (in Arabic: برنامج النقاط العشر) (by Israel called the PLO's Phased Plan) is the plan accepted by the Palestinian National Council (PNC), the legislative body of the Palestine Liberation Organization (PLO), at its 12th meeting held in Cairo on 8 June 1974.

The Program called for the establishment of a national authority "over every part of Palestinian territory that is liberated" with the aim of "completing the liberation of all Palestinian territory". The program implied that the liberation of Palestine may be partial (at least, at some stage), and though it emphasized armed struggle, it did not exclude other means. This allowed the PLO to engage in diplomatic channels, and provided validation for future compromises made by the Palestinian leadership.

Because the Program introduced the concept of a two-state solution in the PLO, it was rejected by the more radical hard-line factions, which vowed to continue to fight to eliminate Israel, and formed the Rejectionist Front, which was strongly backed by Iraq.

Background 
Following the failure of the armies of Egypt and Syria to defeat Israel in 1973 in the Yom Kippur War, the Palestinian leadership began formulating a strategic alternative.

Specifics of the Program
The PLO's Phased Plan did not stipulate clear operational measures and only repeated the principles of the policies which the Palestinian National Council had accepted in the past:

 the denial of United Nations Security Council Resolution 242 (adopted after the Six-Day War)
 the denial of the existence of the State of Israel  
 the demand of the return of all Palestinian refugees to their original homes  
 the establishment of an Arab-Palestinian state in the entire region of Palestine within the pre-1948 borders.

The innovation of PLO's Phased Plan was in the assertion that each step which would lead to the fulfillment of these goals would be a worthy step. It also stated that any territory, from the region of Palestine, which would be transferred to an Arab rule should be transferred to Palestinian control, also if the takeover of other territories would be delayed as a result. Some interpreted these series of decisions, as a realization by the PNC that it can not fulfill all its goals at once, but rather it would be able to do so in gradual small steps, and as a recognition of the council in the possibility of initiating political and diplomatic measures and not just an "armed struggle" (although PLO's Phased Plan does not consist of a denial of the use of an armed struggle).

Section 2 of the Plan states:
 The Palestine Liberation Organization will employ all means, and first and foremost armed struggle, to liberate Palestinian territory and to establish the independent combatant national authority for the people over every part of Palestinian territory that is liberated. This will require further changes being effected in the balance of power in favor of our people and their struggle.

Section 4 of the Plan states:
 Any step taken towards liberation is a step towards the realization of the Liberation Organization's strategy of establishing the democratic Palestinian State specified in the resolutions of the previous Palestinian National Councils.

Section 8 of the Plan states:
Once it is established, the Palestinian national authority will strive to achieve a union of the confrontation countries, with the aim of completing the liberation of all Palestinian territory, and as a step along the road to comprehensive Arab unity.

Palestinian reaction 
The Ten Point Program was rejected by the more radical hard-line factions of the PLO, which were mainly concerned that the Program could potentially turn into a peace agreement with Israel. They formed the Rejectionist Front and vowed to continue the armed struggle to eliminate Israel. The factions that joined the Rejectionist Front included the Popular Front for the Liberation of Palestine (PFLP), the second largest faction in the PLO, after Fatah. These factions would act independently of the PLO over the following years. Suspicion between the Arafat-led mainstream and the more hard-line factions, inside and outside the PLO, have continued to dominate the inner workings of the organization ever since, often resulting in paralysis or conflicting courses of action. A temporary closing of ranks came in 1977, as Palestinian factions joined with hard-line Arab governments in the Steadfastness and Confrontation Front to condemn Egyptian attempts to reach a separate peace with Israel, which eventually resulting in the 1979 Camp David Accords.

Israel's reaction 
Israel called the Program the "PLO's Step/stage Program" or "PLO's Phased Plan" (Tokhnit HaSHlavim or Torat HaSHlavim), which it regarded as a dangerous policy, mainly because it implied that any future compromise agreement between Israel and the Palestinians would not be honored by the PLO. It raised the fear among Israelis that the Palestinians may exploit future Israeli territorial compromises to "improve positions" for attacking Israel.

Over the years, negotiations took place between Israel and the PLO and other Palestinian leaders, while there was a strong concern among large parts of the Israeli public and the Israeli leadership that the negotiations were not sincere, and that the Palestinians' willingness to compromise was just a smoke-screen for implementing the Ten Point Program.

When the Oslo Accords were signed, many Israeli right-wing politicians openly claimed that this was part of the ploy to implement the Ten Point Program. Some of them based this claim on the fact that only 12 days before the signing of the Oslo Accords (September 13, 1993), a pre-recorded speech directed towards the Palestinian people by Arafat himself was broadcast on Jordanian radio, in which Arafat made the following statement about the Oslo agreement:

The Israeli Ministry of Foreign Affairs has regarded that the Palestinian leadership asserted that the Oslo Accord is part of the PLO's 1974 Phased Plan for Israel's destruction.

The status of PLO's Phased Plan nowadays is unclear. The Plan was never officially canceled, but in general, the Palestinian leadership has stopped referring to it since the late 1980s. Recently, however, several statements made by PLO officials on the subject indicate that the Phased Plan has not been abandoned – most notably the statement of the PLO ambassador to Lebanon which stated in an interview that the "two-state solution will lead to the collapse of Israel".

Nowadays there is a debate within Israel on whether the Phased Plan still represents the thinking and official policy of certain factions within the Palestinian leadership and of the Palestinian people and whether the Palestinian public and leadership still aim to ultimately take control over the entire region of Palestine or whether Palestinian territorial claims apply only to the West Bank (including East Jerusalem) and the Gaza Strip.

See also
 Israeli–Palestinian conflict
 PLO
 Salami tactics

References

External links 

 10 Point Program of the PLO (1974) - full text of the PLO's Phased Plan at the website of the Permanent Observer Mission of Palestine to the United Nations



Palestine Liberation Organization
Palestinian nationalism
Foreign relations of the State of Palestine
1974 documents